Holme Low is a civil parish in the Borough of Allerdale in Cumbria, England.  It contains eight listed buildings that are recorded in the National Heritage List for England.  All the listed buildings are designated at Grade II, the lowest of the three grades, which is applied to "buildings of national importance and special interest."  The parish contains small settlements and is otherwise rural.  The listed buildings are houses with associated structures, or farmhouses and farm buildings, and a war memorial.


Buildings

References

Citations

Sources

Lists of listed buildings in Cumbria